Mathildana newmanella, or Newman's mathildana moth, is a species of concealer moth in the family Oecophoridae.

The MONA or Hodges number for Mathildana newmanella is 1059.

References

Further reading

External links

 

Oecophorinae
Moths described in 1864